Nivan-e Suq (also Romanized as Nīvān-e Sūq and Nīvān Sūq; also known as Nīvān, Nivan Soogh, Nivūn, and Niwān) is a village in Nivan Rural District, in the Central District of Golpayegan County, Isfahan Province, Iran. At the 2006 census, its population was 1,047, in 338 families.

References 

Populated places in Golpayegan County